Le Bosc may refer to the following places in France:

 Le Bosc, Ariège, a commune in the department of Ariège
 Le Bosc, Hérault, a commune in the department of Hérault

oc:Le Bòsc